The Intercollegiate Prohibition Association was established in Chicago, Illinois, in 1901 and by 1903 was reported to be the largest college organization in the United States.  It conducted  "an inquiry" among 158 colleges and universities in 1923 and reported that 136 institutions were in favor of prohibition, eight were against it, and 14 were undetermined. It additionally reported that  at 80 out of the 136 institutions in favor of prohibition, support was either by an overwhelming majority or was unanimous. In 1934, a year after the repeal of prohibition, the name was changed to the Intercollegiate Association for the Study of  Alcohol. It ceased operations in 1976, and turned its archives over to the Ohio Historical Society.

Sources
Ohio Historical Society
Wittenberg University Library

External links 
 Winning orations in the national contests of the Intercollegiate Prohibition Association
Social welfare and the liquor problem : studies in the sources of the problem and how they relate to its solution
Several brochures by the Intercollegiate Prohibition Association

Temperance organizations in the United States
1901 establishments in the United States
Student organizations in the United States
Student organizations established in 1901
Organizations disestablished in 1976